1988 World Cup may refer to:
 1985–1988 Rugby League World Cup
 1988 World Cup (men's golf)
 1988 World Cup (snooker)